
Międzychód County is a unit of territorial administration and local government (powiat) in Greater Poland Voivodeship, west-central Poland. It came into being on January 1, 1999, as a result of the Polish local government reforms passed in 1998.

As of 2006 its total population is 36,329, out of which the population of Międzychód is 10,920, that of Sieraków is 5,994, and the rural population is 19,415.

Neighbouring counties
Międzychód County is bordered by Czarnków-Trzcianka County to the north-east, Szamotuły County to the east, Nowy Tomyśl County to the south, Międzyrzecz County to the south-west and Strzelce-Drezdenko County to the north-west.

Administrative division
The county is subdivided into four gminas (two urban-rural and two rural). These are listed in the following table, in descending order of population.

References
Polish official population figures 2006

 
Land counties of Greater Poland Voivodeship